Eyewitness (Øyevitne) is a Norwegian crime drama from 2014, produced by Norway's NRK. It was written and directed by Jarl Emsell Larsen. The series follows the investigation into a multiple homicide witnessed by two teenage boys. The series was remade for USA Network in 2016 as Eyewitness, for HBO Europe as Valea Mută, and for TF1 in 2018 as Les Innocents.

Plot 
Philip and Henning, both 15 years old, live in the small village of Mysen, close to the border between Norway and Sweden. They are classmates and neighbors, but also secretly in love. While secretly meeting at a gravel pit in the nearby forest, they witness the shooting of four members of a criminal gang. The boys are also threatened by the killer, but they manage to overpower him and escape with the murder weapon. To avoid revealing their relationship, they decide to remain silent about being at the scene of the crime.

Helen Sikkeland, the local police chief, is in charge of the investigation into the murder. She is also Philip's foster mother. As the gang violence continues and more resources are devoted to the investigation, the boys' pact of secrecy begins to unravel, causing a rift between Philip and Henning, who is most concerned about revealing why they were in the forest together that night. As Helen continues to search for the truth, Henning is tracked down and attacked by the murderer, who turns out to be much closer to the investigation than anyone realized.

Cast 
 Axel Bøyum as Philip
 Anneke von der Lippe Helen Sikkeland
 Odin Waage as Henning
 Per Kjerstad as Ronny Berg Larsen
 Yngvild Støen Grotmol as Camilla
 Kim Sørensen as Olle
 Yngve Berven as André
 Ingjerd Egeberg as Elisabeth

Adaptations
In January 2016, USA Network gave a 10-episode straight-to-series order to a US adaptation from Shades of Blue producer Adi Hasak titled Eyewitness. Eyewitness premiered on USA Network on 16 October 2016. Starting from 23 October 2016, HBO Europe presented a four-episode Romanian adaptation of the series, titled Valea Mută (The Silent Valley). In January 2018, TF1 aired a six-episode French adaptation of the series, titled Les innocents (The innocents).

Awards 
International Emmy Awards 2015
 Best Performance by an Actress (Anneke von der Lippe) (won)

See also
List of programs broadcast by the Norwegian Broadcasting Corporation

References

External links
 

NRK original programming
2010s crime drama television series
Gay-related television shows
Norwegian LGBT-related television shows
2014 Norwegian television series debuts
2014 Norwegian television series endings
Television shows set in Norway